Slitting Mill is a small village on the outskirts of Rugeley, Staffordshire. At the 2001 census, it had a population of 265.

The village is within Rugeley civil parish, although it is a short distance from the rest of the town and has a distinct identity. Horns Pool is a popular local location for anglers.

The village was once known as Stonehouse, but later changed its name to Slitting Mill. These slitting mills specialized in the production of nails.

Slitting Mill was named after the mills that were situated there during the 17th and 18th centuries. A water pumping station, owned by South Staffordshire Water, draws water from the ground beneath the village.

References

External links
 Brereton and Rugeley Parish Website

Villages in Staffordshire
Rugeley